Edgar Enrique Rolón (born November 28, 1983 in Fernando de la Mora, Paraguay) is a Paraguayan footballer currently playing for General Caballero of the Primera División in Paraguay.

Rolón began his football career with Club Sport Colombia. He moved to Club Guaraní where, after a spell with the reserves, he joined the first team following an injury to fellow midfielder Pedro Richard Irala.

Teams
  Sport Colombia 2004
  Guaraní 2005-2006
  Fernando de la Mora 2007
  Club Benjamín Aceval 2008
  Deportes Puerto Montt 2009
  General Caballero 2010
  Persela Lamongan 2011
  PSMS Medan 2013

References

 Edgar Enrique Rolón at BDFA 
 

1981 births
Living people
People from Fernando de la Mora, Paraguay
Paraguayan footballers
Paraguayan expatriate footballers
General Caballero Sport Club footballers
Club Guaraní players
Puerto Montt footballers
Primera B de Chile players
Expatriate footballers in Chile
Association football midfielders